The United Development System Party is a Ghanaian political party registered with the Electoral Commission of Ghana. It was founded in 2012. Its first leader in 2012 was Tetteh Kabraham Early.

See also
 List of political parties in Ghana

References

External links
Political parties in Ghana, their emblems and colours

2012 establishments in Ghana
Political parties established in 2012
Political parties in Ghana